Sirius Satellite Radio was a satellite radio (SDARS) and online radio service operating in North America, owned by Sirius XM Holdings.

Headquartered in New York City, with smaller studios in Los Angeles and Memphis, Sirius was officially launched on July 1, 2002. It now provides 69 streams (channels) of music and 65 streams of sports, news, and entertainment to its subscribers. Music streams on Sirius carry a wide variety of genres broadcasting 24 hours daily, commercial-free, and uncensored. A subset of Sirius music channels is included as part of the Dish Network satellite television service. Sirius channels are identified by Nielsen Audio with the label "SR" (e.g. "SR120", "SR9", "SR17").

Its business model is to provide pay-for-service radio, analogous to the business model for premium cable television. Music channels are presented without advertising, while its talk channels, such as Howard Stern's Howard 100 and Howard 101 and Jason Ellis' Faction talk 103, carry commercials. Because all channels are free from FCC content regulation, songs are played unedited for language; talk programs may also feature explicit content if they wish. Subscriptions are prepaid and range in price from US$14.99 monthly (US$9.99 for each additional receiver) to US$699.99 for lifetime (of the receiver equipment). There is a US$15 activation fee for every radio activated. Sirius announced it had achieved its first positive cash flow quarter for the period ending December 2006.

Sirius launched its radio service in four states on February 14, 2002, expanding service to the rest of the contiguous U.S. by July of that year. On October 16, 2006, Sirius announced that it would be launching Sirius Internet Radio, with 78 of its 135 channels being available worldwide on the internet to any of its subscribers with a valid user name and password.

On July 29, 2008, Sirius formally completed its merger with former competitor XM Satellite Radio. The combined company began operating under the name Sirius XM Satellite Radio. On November 12, 2008, Sirius and XM began broadcasting with their new, combined channel lineups. On January 13, 2011, Sirius Satellite Radio was dissolved as a separate entity and merged into Sirius XM Radio, Inc.

Early days of Sirius
Sirius was founded by Martine Rothblatt, who served as the new company's Chairman of the Board. Co-founder David Margolese served as Chief Executive Officer and Robert Briskman served as President and Chief Operating Officer. In 1990, Rothblatt founded Satellite CD Radio, Inc. in Washington, D.C. The company was the first to petition the FCC to assign unused frequencies for satellite radio broadcast, which "provoked a furor among owners of both large and small [terrestrial] radio stations." Rothblatt had previously helped create the PanAmSat international satellite television system, and helped launch and served as CEO of the Geostar satellite navigation system. In April 1992, she resigned as chairman and CEO of Sirius in order to start a medical research foundation, focused on finding a cure for her daughter's illness. Former NASA engineer Robert Briskman, who designed the company's satellite technology, was then appointed Chairman and CEO.

Six months later, in November 1992, Rogers Wireless co-founder David Margolese, who had provided financial backing for the venture, acquired control of the company and succeeded Briskman. Margolese renamed the company CD Radio, and spent the next five years lobbying the FCC to allow satellite radio to be deployed, and the following five years raising $1.6 billion, which was used to build and launch three satellites into elliptical orbit from Kazakhstan in July 2000. The company successfully bid $83.3 million to purchase their satellite radio license. In 1997, after Margolese had obtained regulatory clearance and "effectively created the industry," the FCC also sold a license to XM Satellite Radio, which followed Sirius's example.

In November 1999, Marketing chief Ira Bahr convinced Margolese to again change the name of the company, this time to Sirius Satellite Radio, in order to avoid association with the soon-to-be-outdated CD technology. It had secured installation deals with automakers including Chrysler, Ford and BMW. Sirius launched the initial phase of its service in four cities, with the first receiver sold at Cowboy Maloney's in Jackson, MS on February 14, 2002, expanding to the rest of the contiguous United States on July 1, 2002. In 2001 Margolese stepped down as CEO, remaining as chairman until November 2003, with Sirius issuing a statement thanking him "for his great vision, leadership and dedication in creating both Sirius and the satellite radio industry."

The first confirmed music transmission from satellite to radio receiver for Sirius was September 1, 2000, in NYC at the current HQ of SiriusXM. Ten employees were present during the first music transmission. One being Lawrence J. Simon, current VP Business and Ground Ops (Former B2B board member for NASCAR, Director of labs for Lockheed Martin and Grumman), Paul De Lia, current Senior Advisor for BCG ( Former CTO for L3-Harris).

Joe Clayton, former CEO of Global Crossing, followed as CEO from November 2001 until November 2004. He remained chairman until July 2008. Mel Karmazin, former president of Viacom, became CEO in November 2004 and remained in that position through the merger in December 2012.

Merger with XM Satellite Radio and company restructuring

On February 19, 2007, Sirius announced a merger deal with competitor XM Satellite Radio. If the pending merger received government approval, which was required because of antitrust considerations, it would combine the two services into a single satellite radio network in the United States and would be named Sirius/XM Radio.

On March 24, 2008, the U.S. Department of Justice approved the merger of Sirius and XM. Approval from the FCC cleared on July 25, 2008. Conditions of the merger included allowing any third-party company to make satellite radio devices; producing new radios that can receive both XM and Sirius channels within one year; allowing consumers to choose which channels they would like to have; freezing subscription rates for three years; setting aside 8% of its channels for noncommercial programmers; and paying $19.7 million in fines for past rule violations.

Content

Channels
List of Sirius XM Radio channels
According to a Spring 2007 Arbitron report, the five channels most listened to on Sirius based on their average quarterly hour (AQH) share were Howard 100, Howard 101, The Highway (56), Sirius Hits 1, and Octane (37).

Howard Stern

On October 6, 2004, Sirius announced that it had signed a five-year, US$100 million per year agreement with Howard Stern to move his radio show, The Howard Stern Show, to Sirius starting on January 9, 2006. Stern said his move was forced by the stringent regulations of the FCC whose enforcement was intensified following the Super Bowl XXXVIII halftime show controversy. In the wake of the announcement of his pending departure, Stern complained that Infinity Broadcasting was making his departure more acrimonious than was necessary. The deal, which gave Sirius exclusive rights to Stern's radio show, also gave Stern the right to build three full-time programming channels. His audience had grown almost tenfold by the end of his second year on Sirius, from fewer than 700,000 subscribers to 6 million (see graph on the right). Stern now has two channels operating on Sirius, but still retains the right to a third.

Programming content
Sirius/XM's channels carried an array of programming that covered Music, News/Talk, Sports, and Entertainment. Sirius had deals with entertainers and personalities for broadcast streams. Besides Stern, Sirius had deals with Martha Stewart, E Street Band member Steven Van Zandt, Jimmy Buffett, and Eminem to executive-produce streams or channels on Sirius. Van Zandt created two stations for Sirius: the Underground Garage, dedicated to garage rock, and Outlaw Country with its focus on alternative country music.

The majority of the company's programming was self-produced exclusively for Sirius. However, there were some shows—especially in the Talk genre—that were originally created for terrestrial radio, but then aired on conventional radio and on Sirius/XM simultaneously; one example was the Eternal Word Television Network.

Among the hosts with Sirius/XM shows were:

 Sports figures such as Lance Armstrong, NBA Hall of Famer Bill Walton, sports show host Scott Ferrall, fantasy football experts John Hansen and Adam Caplan from FantasyGuru.com, skateboarder Tony Hawk, skateboarder/MTV personality Bam Margera, and skateboarder Jason Ellis.
 Musicians such as Joan Jett, Keith Morris of Black Flag, the B-52's lead singer Fred Schneider, Marky Ramone of The Ramones, and New York Dolls singer David Johansen.
 Veteran DJs including New York City DJ Bruce Morrow, freeform radio pioneer Vin Scelsa, Richard Blade, Joe Causi and Kid Leo.
 Original MTV veejays Mark Goodman, Nina Blackwood, Alan Hunter and Martha Quinn.
 Hip Hop superstars Eminem and 50 Cent, along with veterans such as Grandmaster Flash, Kool DJ Red Alert, Kurtis Blow, and DJ Premier.
 Such popular dance music artists and DJs as Paul Oakenfold, Paul Van Dyk, Liquid Todd, Pete Tong, The Riddler and DJ Icey.
 Political commentators including Bill Press, Andrew Wilkow, Mike Church, Rusty Humphries, Mike Malloy, Lynn Samuels, Glenn Beck, Michael Smerconish, and Sean Hannity.
 Comedians and satirists including Harry Shearer, Duane Cahill, Mojo Nixon, and Jim Breuer.
 Entertainment such as Cosmo and Maxim Radio featuring Covino and Rich.

Sports
Sirius also broadcast sports content. It had exclusive satellite radio broadcasting rights to all NFL, CFL and NBA games. In December 2005, Sirius announced a multi-year deal with the NBA. The agreement also created a 24-hour NBA Radio Channel. Sirius aired Full Court Press, an all-NBA show. On November 12, 2008, NBA games switched to XM and were replaced by Sporting News Radio. NHL games were shared with XM for the 2005–2006 season, and in 2007 Sirius/XM gained exclusive rights to NHL games. Sirius also had full NASCAR coverage, including a weekly show hosted by now-retired driver Tony Stewart. In 2009, Sirius/XM was the first to carry live coverage of the 24-hour road race from Le Mans.

Sirius/XM also had the rights to a number of major college sports teams, including teams in the Big East, Big Ten and Southeastern Conferences, as well as The University of Notre Dame. Beginning in 2005, Sirius also had exclusive radio rights to cover the NCAA Division I men's basketball tournament. In August 2004, Sirius launched Sirius NFL Radio, a 24-hour radio stream for covering the NFL.

Sirius also had the only national Horse racing talk show, At the Races, hosted by noted racing handicapper, Steve Byk.

The Hardcore Poker Show, hosted by Rob Pizzo and Chris Tessaro, was the only syndicated poker talk show in North America.

Sirius also broadcast select Premier League matches. On September 27, 2006, Sirius announced a deal to add UEFA Champions League soccer to their lineup. Sirius had exclusive radio rights to broadcast the ESPN television feed of the Euro 2008 championships. Sirius also aired a soccer talk show called "The Football Show" with former Metrostars GM Charlie Stillitano and former International Italian star Giorgio Chinaglia. On Saturdays and Sundays during premier league season, Sirius aired Radio 606, a classic radio call-in show from the UK discussing all of the days top matches.

On September 15, 2008, Chris Russo launched his own show called Mad Dog Unleashed.

After the merger between Sirius and XM was completed, Major League Baseball games remained exclusive to XM Radio as a result of an arrangement dispute between MLB and Sirius XM, which prevented Sirius subscribers from listening to games. However, on August 19, 2013, Sirius XM reached an agreement with MLB allowing all customers with both Sirius and XM receivers to hear the games with a premium subscription.

SiriusXM for Business
In August 2003, Sirius partnered with Clearwater, Florida-based Applied Media Technologies Corporation, a provider of telephone "on hold" messaging. AMTC provides Sirius service in a package branded as Sirius Music for Business. For US$29.95 per month, AMTC provides all of Sirius' streams of commercial-free music, and pays all performance royalties to ASCAP, Broadcast Music Incorporated, and SESAC, so that business owners may legally play Sirius' music in their establishments.

Unlike the music services Muzak / DMX Music or Music Choice, the SiriusXM for Business service uses the same channels and SDARS delivery platform as the consumer Sirius service. The SDARS delivery platform, on the other hand, is more reliable than any of the other services in that it is not subject to satellite dish rain fade. The highly elliptical orbit of the Sirius satellite constellation can pose difficulties for the reliable delivery of the signal to stationary antennas in certain parts of the country. To eliminate this potential problem, Sirius launched a new geostationary satellite, FM-5, to improve service to non-mobile customers such as those of SiriusXM for Business. The service can also be accessed online using Sirius' online streaming technology, allowing any business with a broadband Internet connection to overcome any potential reception issues. Additionally, Sirius applied for repeaters in Hawaii and Alaska and has already been granted authority for 20 repeaters covering the island of Puerto Rico by the Federal Communications Commission (FCC).

Sirius Backseat TV
In March 2007, Sirius announced the availability of its first video service called "Backseat TV". In August 2007, the company revealed details of the first receiver, the SCV1, was originally offered exclusively through Chrysler OEM factory units. The service includes streaming video from three "family" television channels: Nickelodeon, Disney Channel and Cartoon Network Mobile. There is a single screen (or a dual screen option in the Chrysler Town and Country and Dodge Grand Caravan) for back seat passengers to watch while front seat passengers have the option of simultaneously listening to any normal Sirius radio channel. The service is reported to cost an additional US$6.99 per month on top of the standard Sirius subscription price. The MSRP of the factory installed units is US$470 and the aftermarket unit has an MSRP of US$299.99. Both were made available in the fourth quarter of 2007. As of 1 January 2016 the service has been discontinued.

Other content
In June 2005, Sirius signed an agreement with BBC Radio 1 in the UK to rebroadcast the station to an American audience. In August 2011, Sirius dropped BBC Radio 1, but a week later they announced that the channel would return online.

Sirius also had exclusive satellite radio rights to National Public Radio, carrying two separate streams. The Sirius NPR NOW programming didn't include the popular programs All Things Considered and Morning Edition.

With the launch of Sirius Canada in December 2005, American listeners gained five Canadian-produced stations including CBC Radio One, CBC Radio Three and Iceberg Radio, and Première Plus, Énergie2, and Bande à part for French listeners. Iceberg Radio is programmed by Standard Broadcasting, which also provides a number of additional channels exclusive to Canada; the other four come from the Canadian Broadcasting Corporation. After a delay and outcry from Canadian subscribers, Sirius Canada added Howard Stern's Channel 100 to their lineup in early 2006. Channel 101, Stern's other channel (featuring Bubba the Love Sponge, Scott Ferrall, and other personalities), were made available in late June 2006.

Talk radio content recently added onto Sirius Satellite Radio include the ABC News and Talk channel 143 (since having ceased operations), including live feeds of Sean Hannity and Larry Elder's syndicated radio shows, Patriot Talk channel 125 (which includes Michael Reagan's syndicated radio show) and Fox News Talk channel 145 (which includes syndicated radio hosts such as Alan Colmes and John Gibson).

On March 14, 2006, Sirius added Cosmo Radio, Playboy Radio, and returned the audio simulcast of the Fox News Channel TV feed, which was previously removed during a contract dispute. The service also added Fox's satellite talk radio channel, Fox News Talk.

In April 2003, Sirius launched Sirius OutQ, the first-ever 24/7 talk channel designed for the LGBT audience. Personalities associated with the channel include Frank DeCaro, Michelangelo Signorile, Derek Hartley, and Romaine Patterson.

In addition to the audio programming, the Sirius broadcast stream also carries a Data Services channel that is utilized by capable receivers and graphical display hardware. Some of the data services offered are traffic speed and flow, marine weather, and fuel prices to name just a few. Examples of capable hardware are the Raymarine SR100 Satellite Weather receiver and the Alpine NVE-N872A Satellite Traffic Ready navigation system.

Exclusive channels
The Howard Stern Show aka Howard 100 and Howard 101
Elvis Radio
Iceberg Radio
CBC Radio 3
Rock Velours
Énergie2
Sports extra
Hardcore Sports Radio
Sports express
ESPN All Access
Radio Korea
NPR Talk
RCI +
CBC Radio One
The Weather Network Satellite Radio Service
Sporting News Radio

Technology
The Sirius signal is separated into three carriers, one each for the two satellites, and the third for the terrestrial repeater network where available. Sirius receivers decode all three 4 MHz carrier signals at once to achieve signal diversity. This is in contrast to XM which uses six carriers and decodes three 2 MHz carriers to economize on receiver power consumption and complexity at the cost of channel-changing speed. There is an intentional four-second delay between the two satellite carrier signals. This enables the receiver to maintain a large buffer of the audio stream, which, along with forward error correction, helps keep the audio playing in the event that the signal is temporarily lost, such as when driving under an overpass or otherwise losing line-of-sight of any of the satellites or ground repeater stations.

A third, separate signal is uplinked to the AMC-6 Ku-band satellite and received by  satellite dishes for the ground repeater network. This third signal is broadcast on a third segment of the signal.

Signal architecture and early prototypes
The technology for Sirius Satellite Radio receivers as well as some of the uplink equipment, and the studio encoder, originated at Bell Labs in the late 1990s and subsequent years. The studio encoder was a result of Bell Labs' efforts in statistical multiplexing of perceptual audio coded signals, a cousin of the MP3 standards. The waveform design for the terrestrial and satellite signals, as well as the early prototype receivers, were implemented in an FPGA logic and tested in the field to verify the performance of the receivers. This work was contracted by Sirius to Lucent Technologies, at the time a spinoff of AT&T. Early prototypes were followed by a number of generations of ASIC custom designed chipsets, supplied at first by Agere Systems and later supplied by Agere Systems and their competitor STMicroelectronics.

Three signals from three different sources (satellite, satellite, and terrestrial) are therefore combined in the receiver as radio signals, (not as audio signals). The three signals need to be combined constructively (avoiding situations where bad signals pollute good signals) in the receiver before being decoded. Heavy error correction is applied to the signals. All three signals contain the same audio content on all the channels that the receiver can receive, with the exception of one audio program waveform being transmitted ahead of the other two by approximately four seconds. With this time skew, the signals, once realigned, need to see an 8-second obstruction of overpass fade in order to lose audio content. This increases the robustness of the signal delivery in most driving conditions.

In order to recover meaningful signal and error-free audio from a signal impaired by interference and fading, the receiver uses concatenated Reed-Solomon block coding and Forward Error Correction encoding and decoding (codec). This technique was proven in the early days of satellite modems in the late 1970s. Linkabit, then run by Irwin Jacobs prior to his involvement with Qualcomm, offered such a codec for rack mounting in satellite earth stations. The Sirius signal uses more robust error correction on control channels than on the audio content, trading off error correction and bandwidth differently for separate categories of bits in the signal waveform.

The terrestrial carrier is an OFDM QPSK signal, and cousin to WiMax and LTE, with the particular feature that more than one transmitter operates on the same frequency, forming a single frequency network. A number of transmitters can be placed around a city to create coverage that is less subject to fading than if a single transmitter were used. The satellite signal is QPSK. Both satellite and terrestrial signals have hierarchical modulation superposed on the original signal, a measure created to add bandwidth at a small expense in the satellite link budget for decoding the core audio content.

This architecture has worked remarkably well in avoiding drop out of audio signal when driving under highway overpasses, and when scintillating (very deep and frequent losses in signal strength caused by radio fading from trees) conditions exist. Since Sirius and XM separately entered the market with incompatible waveforms on the satellite, one would logically conclude that the merged company will eventually evolve the signal format again to take advantage of their size, but this is a speculative statement. The use of a satellite and terrestrial combined service has been adopted by the DVB-SH standard, and companies such as ICO communications who cooperated with Alcatel-Lucent on system design and field trials. ONDAS, a Madrid-based company, also adopted this pioneering system architecture.

Receiver technology
The receiver is designed to mitigate and retain signal quality in hostile signal conditions and the relatively weak signal levels from distant satellites. Because the satellites are not all geostationary they appear and disappear over the horizon. Terrestrial signals are present only in major cities to augment the satellite signals.

Approximately five chipset versions were built by Agere and approximately 4 versions were built by STMicroelectronics after the initial prototypes, although all of the early receivers included an Agere chipset known as Northstar. This platform enjoyed the highest volume of chipsets to date, representing the bulk of total production from 2002 to 2010. As of 2010, most of the chipsets are produced by STMicroelectronics.

At the heart of a Sirius receiver is a custom application-specific integrated circuit (ASIC) chip called the Baseband Integrated Circuit currently the STA240, which is produced by STMicroelectronics. The chip contains embedded ARM7TDMI and ARM946E-S microprocessors synthesized from IP cores. Every baseband has a unique Electronic Serial Number (or Sirius ID). Another major section of a Sirius receiver is the tuner. The tuner is also a custom ASIC, the STA210. The tuner connects to the antenna, and receives the incoming satellite and terrestrial signals at 2.315 GHz and downconverts them to intermediate frequency signals at around 75 MHz. The strength of the signals is approximately −50dBm in clear-sky conditions. The IF signals are fed to the STA240, which are digitized, demodulated, error-corrected, de-interleaved, and decrypted using specialized circuits on the chip. The baseband processor utilizes a 16MB SDRAM memory to buffer four seconds of one of the satellite signals in order to bring it into time coincidence with the other for Maximal-ratio combining. On newer receivers with a "pause" feature, a dual-port PSRAM is employed to store up to 60 minutes of the selected channel. The baseband processor outputs digital audio over a Serial Peripheral Interface, which is fed to a D/A converter to produce the analog audio signal. The front-end of a Sirius receiver is called the head unit, required to display descriptive text (such as the category, channel, artist, and song name) and provide controls to the user. This is implemented by the third-party designers of Sirius-ready receivers, using a microprocessor of their choice.

Sirius offers car radios and home entertainment systems, as well as car and home kits for portable use. The Sirius receiver includes the antenna module and the receiver module. The antenna module picks up signals from the ground repeaters or the satellite, amplifies the signal and filters out any interference. The signal is then passed on to the receiver module. Inside the receiver module is a chipset consisting of eight chips. The chipset converts the signals from 2.3 gigahertz (GHz) to a lower intermediate frequency. Sirius also offers an adapter that allows conventional car radios to receive satellite signals.

Sirius broadcasts using 12.5 MHz of the S band between 2320 and 2332.5 MHz. Audio channels are digitally compressed using a proprietary variant of Lucent's Perceptual Audio Coder compression algorithm and encrypted with a proprietary conditional access system. Sirius has announced that they intend to implement hierarchical modulation technology to economize on bandwidth up to 25%.

Each receiver must be connected to an external antenna, which is included with the receiver. Antenna placement is crucial to receiving a clear signal. In some locations users have experienced difficulty receiving the Sirius programming because the signal is not consistently strong. For the best reception, antennas should be placed such that they have an unobstructed view of the sky (preferably on rooftops without overhanging eaves or trees). If this is not an option, the antenna should be placed on an exterior wall. When placing on an exterior wall, the antenna should be mounted to a wall which faces the southern continental United States in order to minimize the likelihood of the building itself blocking the signal.

Satellite technology 
Sirius' satellites are named Radiosat because there is already a fleet of satellites named Sirius, launched by Sweden's NSAB (Nordiska Satellitaktiebolaget, or Nordic Satellite AB, and known today as SES Sirius) and used for general telecommunications and satellite television throughout Sweden and the rest of Scandinavia.

The current primary uplink facility for Sirius, which was formerly used as the uplink site for Western Union's Westar fleet of communication satellites from the early 1970s to the late 1980s, is located in Glenwood, New Jersey. The original facility was located on the roof of the building housing the Sirius studios in Rockefeller Center in New York City but has since been decommissioned.

Sirius' spacecraft Radiosat 1 through Radiosat 4 were manufactured by Space Systems/Loral. The first three of the series were orbited in 2000 by Proton K Block-DM3 launch vehicles, with the final three-satellite constellation completed on November 30, 2000. Radiosat 4, built as a ground spare for the now-decommissioned elliptical mission, was transferred to the Smithsonian Institution's National Air and Space Museum in October 2012. It is on display at the Steven F. Udvar-Hazy Center. The satellites are based on the Space Systems/Loral 1300 platform. Before the elliptical satellites were decommissioned, all three satellites broadcast directly to the consumer's receiver, but due to the highly elliptical orbit only two of them broadcast at any given time.  Today the satellites are located in the southern sky in the United States.

Satellites Radiosat 1 through Radiosat 3, now decommissioned, fly in geosynchronous (not geostationary) Tundra orbits. Like the geostationary orbit, the tundra orbit has a period of 23 hours, 56 minutes (one sidereal day). Unlike the geostationary orbit, the tundra orbit is elliptical, not circular, and is inclined with respect to the equator rather than orbiting directly over it. The eccentric orbit ensures that each satellite spends about 16 hours of each day high over the continental United States. At least one satellite is always visible, with another often visible as well. The orbit's high inclination places apogee just west of Hudson Bay in Canada, providing a much higher elevation angle for most of the country than is possible from a geostationary orbit. This was intended to reduce blockage from tall buildings in urban areas, allowing a much smaller terrestrial repeater network than does sister network XM, which uses geostationary orbits. This system has since been decommissioned in favor of newer geostationary satellites located at 96.0° and 116.15° that support both the Sirius and XM platforms.

On June 8, 2006, Space Systems/Loral announced that it was awarded a contract for the fifth Sirius spacecraft. The new spacecraft features a nine-meter unfurlable reflector. The first four Sirius spacecraft used more traditional parabolic reflectors. The new satellite has been designed for geostationary orbit, unlike the other satellites in the constellation; the different orbit has the stated purpose of allowing for more consistent reception for fixed location users (many subscribers have reported having to regularly reposition their antennas for optimal reception). Radiosat 5 (FM-5) is in a geostationary orbit at 96.0° West. It was launched June 30, 2009, and announced to be in service as of September 9, 2009.

On October 14, 2010, the XM-5 satellite was launched aboard an International Launch Services (ILS) Proton vehicle. It was placed into a geostationary orbit at 85.2° West to serve the eastern half of the United States. It is named XM-5 because it serves as an in-orbit spare that can replace both the Sirius Radiosat satellites and the XM satellites. The satellite was manufactured by Space Systems/Loral and was fully operational on December 3, 2010.

On February 29, 2008, the launch service provider International Launch Services (ILS) announced a contract which includes a launch of the SIRIUS FM-6 satellite on a Proton Briz M launch vehicle. The launch planned for March 6, 2012, was canceled due to concerns with a design defect in the solar panel deployment. The Radiosat 6 (FM-6) satellite was launched on October 25, 2013, and was put in a geostationary orbit at 116.15° West which services the western half of the United States.

Satellites
 Sirius FM-1 (Radiosat 1). Launch occurred on 30 June 2000.
 Sirius FM-2 (Radiosat 2). Launch occurred on 5 September 2000.
 Sirius FM-3 (Radiosat 3). Launch occurred on 30 November 2000.
 Sirius FM-4 (Radiosat 4). Ground spare, was not launched into orbit. Donated to Smithsonian Institution's National Air and Space Museum in October 2012.
 Sirius FM-5 (Radiosat 5). Launch occurred 30 June 2009.
 Sirius FM-6 (Radiosat 6). Launch occurred October 25, 2013.

Receivers
, Sirius receivers were available for various new Audi, BMW, Chrysler, Dodge, Ford, Jaguar, Jeep, Land Rover, Lexus, Lincoln, Mazda, Mercedes-Benz, Mercury, MINI, Mitsubishi, Scion, Toyota (except Corolla), Porsche, Volkswagen, and Volvo vehicles, and the service plans on adding availability for portable use. Subaru offers Sirius on the Forester and Impreza. Starting in 2006, all Rolls-Royce vehicles sold in the United States came with a Sirius radio and lifetime subscription as standard equipment. Sirius had an exclusive contract for VW and Audi vehicles from 2007 through 2012, and with Kia Motors from 2008 through 2014, with an optional extension to 2017. Beginning in the 2007 model year, Bentley vehicles have had Sirius as an option, and it became standard equipment in several models beginning in 2008. Porsche switched to XM Satellite Radio on their vehicles beginning with the 2007 model year. Currently, only Toyota (including its Lexus and Scion divisions) and Subaru offer both Sirius and XM contracts (however both companies usually equip vehicles with XM).

Sirius also makes several receivers for aftermarket installations such as the Sportster4, Starmate Replay, Sirius S50 with a built-in 1GB MP3 player, and the Sirius One. Radios from Sirius include:
 Sportster 5 – plug and play radio with a color screen and one hour of storage
 Sirius Stiletto 100 – the first portable Sirius radio that allows subscribers to listen to live Sirius programming. The Stiletto boasts a 2 gigabyte memory, which is roughly equivalent to 100 hours of recording time. The unit's batteries give the user approximately 30 hours of life. The unit also features Wi-Fi technology, which is used as a backup to stream music from the Internet when a clear signal strength is not readily available from the built-in antenna. Sirius' partnerships with Napster and Yahoo Music provide additional content for Stiletto users.
 Sirius Stiletto 10 -The "feature"-lite version to the Stiletto 100. The Stiletto 10 offers all that the Stiletto 100 offers but does not offer Wi-Fi, MP3/WMA playback and only offers 256 megabytes of storage space (about 10 hours of Sirius programming). The Stiletto 10 offers Artist and Song Seek – Not featured on the Stiletto 100 or Stiletto 2. This seek function watches for a driver's favorite artists and songs that he or she wants to hear and will let him or her know when they are playing on any other station.
 Sirius Stiletto 2 – the newest portable Sirius radio. A slimmer, improved version of the Stilleto 100. Has a microSD slot behind the battery for storing MP3/WMA files and playlists (not Sirius content). Wi-Fi support expanded to handle WPA and WPA2 (non-Enterprise) with passcodes.
 Sportster 3 was the first radio to use the new universal dock station.
 Sirius S50 – the first portable Sirius radio – which is not a LIVE portable, it has to be plugged into a home or car dock where content can be downloaded for later listening. The RIAA through its efforts to amend the Audio Home Recording Act and its lawsuit against XM Radio has crippled the S50 as it tried to limit the number and quality of downloads available to consumers.
 Sirius Starmate ST1 (note: ST1C is the Canadian version)
 Sirius Starmate Replay ST2
 Sirius Sportster Exec. Docking Station Package
 Sirius Sportster Radio with Boombox Package
 Tivoli Sirius Table Radio
 Kenwood H2EV Radio with Car and Home Kits
 Clarion Calypso Sirius Radio with Car Kit
 XACT XTR1 Radio with Car Kit
 SiriusConnect for Pioneer SIR-PNR1 which can be modified to provide a Serial or USB Serial interface to control the radio.

On-line media streaming options

For an additional fee, Sirius subscribers are also able to access all of the proprietary music channels and most of the talk stations via streaming media through Sirius.com. A standard 64 kbit/s and "Premium" 128 kbit/s feed are available.

Alternatives to the browser-based player are available such as a Yahoo! Widget (designed to look like a miniature Sportster model receiver), and SIRIUS Internet Radio Player (based on Windows Media Player and available as a plug-in or standalone application). Both alternatives have gained popularity with streaming listeners, and offer artist and track name information updated in real time, which is an improvement from the online Sirius player.

Recently, SiriusXMStream has come available as a replacement to uSirius. It offers a server capability to stream Sirius and XM programming to game consoles and mobile phones as an alternative to the iPhone And Blackberry app.

NiceMac LLC, creator of the StarPlayr and StarLightXM product lines have created clients for Mac, PC, Windows Mobile and iPhone. The company merged with Millard Software and released a private beta of uSirius StarPlayr, a Sirius XM iPhone client, but on March 8, 2009, the beta was discontinued. Early 2019, StarPlayrX, an accessible and open source Swift version was released to Apple's App Store.

CatPig Studios Inc. has also released Radium for Mac, a general-purpose internet radio player that supports XM and Sirius. In early 2010, Rogue Amoeba software released Pulsar, a standalone Sirius-XM player for Mac OS X.

In addition to being available through Sirius.com, Howard Stern's website offers a Java application that streams the two Stern-themed channels. The site also states that Stern-specific video and audio clips would be made available at a later date.

Apple iOS app
Sirius XM has developed a software application for use on the Apple iPhone, iPad and iPod Touch devices that allows its subscribers and users of those devices to listen to its programming. The application was released and available for download on the evening of June 17, 2009. The Sirius XM app is available at the iTunes App Store. Also integrated into the app is a "click to buy" function where if a user clicks any song title playing on Sirius XM they are given the option to be taken to the iTunes Music Store where they can purchase the track or album. Due to the terms of a new contract, the Howard Stern channels were added on Tuesday, December 21.

Android app
Sirius XM has developed a streaming app for the Android Smartphone platform. This app is available free of charge in the market, and requires an additional US$3.49/mo to subscribe to. The app features all of the content available on a standard Sirius receiver.

BlackBerry app
Sirius XM has also developed an application for use on certain 3G-enabled Rim BlackBerry smartphones. Much like its Apple counterpart, it features a restricted 120-channel lineup featuring most of the music channels and selected talk programming. As with the Apple app, some select programming, including MLB Play-by-Play, NFL Play-by-Play, SIRIUS NASCAR Radio are not available on the Blackberry. Shortly after signing a new contract, Howard Stern began promoting the mobile app, and his content was added to the mobile offerings.

Blackberry smartphones currently compatible with the Sirius app:
 BlackBerry Bold (excluding the 9900 and the 9930)
 BlackBerry Curve 83301
 BlackBerry Curve 8500
 BlackBerry Curve 8900
 BlackBerry Storm
 BlackBerry Storm 2
 BlackBerry Tour
1 If OS version is above 5.0.239

In Canada

In November 2004, a partnership between Sirius, Standard Broadcasting and the Canadian Broadcasting Corporation filed an application with the Canadian Radio-television and Telecommunications Commission to introduce Sirius in Canada. The application was approved on June 16, 2005. The decision was appealed to the Canadian federal cabinet by a number of broadcasting, labour, and arts and culture organizations, including the Friends of Canadian Broadcasting, CHUM Limited, and the National Campus and Community Radio Association. The groups objected to Sirius’ approach to and reduced levels of Canadian content and French-language programming, along with the exclusion of Canadian non-commercial broadcasting. After a lengthy debate, the cabinet rejected the appeals on September 9, 2005. Sirius Canada was officially launched December 1, 2005.

In 2006 it offered a lifetime plan to subscribers that for a $549 fee it would unlock the top tier channels for unlimited use on any Sirius device, including the Internet and phone. However, the company currently only offers at maximum, a three-year subscription.

The Canadian Broadcasting Corporation has reported poor reception in northern Canada.

In Puerto Rico
In September 2009, The Federal Communications Commission agreed to Sirius XM's request for a special temporary authority to operate 20 terrestrial repeaters for the satellite radio service in Puerto Rico.

The commission did so over the objections of the Puerto Rico Radio Broadcasters Association (Asociación de Radiodifusores de Puerto Rico), who said the approval expands the Sirius XM reach outside its authorized coverage area and would allow Sirius XM to compete with terrestrial broadcasters for listeners.

After receiving communications by public officials in opposition to the broadcasters, such as Puerto Rico Secretary of State Kenneth McClintock, in rejecting those arguments, the commission said Sirius XM's footprint already covers the island but the signal is weak and blocked by tall buildings and foliage. As for the impact on competition, the FCC said it has considered these arguments before and "declined to find that" satellite radio would harm local broadcasters.

The Sirius full terrestrial coverage is available in select sites in the cities of San Juan, Carolina, Bayamón, Cataño, Caguas and Ponce. In the rest of Puerto Rico, coverage is provided by Sirius' constellation of satellites.

Sirius Internet Radio
In October 2006, Sirius announced that it was launching a new service named Sirius Internet Radio (SIR) that offered approximately 75 of the 135 Sirius channels worldwide to people other than subscribers to its satellite radio service. Prior to this, Sirius subscribers who had a satellite radio were also able to access many of the Sirius channels via the Internet, using a special password, but the service operated at 32 kbit/s and was only available to those who purchased a satellite radio receiver. Sirius Internet Radio is an Internet-only subscription, allowing worldwide listeners to listen to the content without having to purchase a satellite radio receiver, the internet subscription can also be heard on Wi-Fi-enabled Internet radio for consumer and business purposes such as those designed by Grace Digital. The service also expands the number of channels that are available to Sirius Stiletto 100 users via Wi-Fi.

Liberty Media Corporation investment
As of February 11, 2009, Sirius XM had $3.25 billion in total debt and had until February 17, 2009, to repay $175 million in bonds held by EchoStar. EchoStar has been buying Sirius XM's debt since an unsuccessful December 2008 takeover bid. Shares of Sirius XM had been trading for less than $1 from September 10, 2008, until February 2010.
The company announced in early February 2009 that it may file for bankruptcy "as early as" Tuesday, February 17, 2009.
On February 17, 2009, Sirius entered into an investment agreement with Liberty Media Corporation. Sirius received $550 million to pay maturing debt in exchange for 40% of its convertible preferred stock.

Class action lawsuits 
SiriusXM has been involved in several high-profile class action lawsuits.

 Hooker v. Sirius XM radio was settled with a settlement pool of US$35 million in response to claims that SiriusXM denies that the company used robocalling techniques targeting non-subscribers that had received calls from SiriusXM after leasing or buying a car.
 Blessing v. Sirius XM Class Action Suit – On August 25, 2011, the Court presiding over the lawsuit, Blessing v. Sirius XM Radio Inc., approved a class action settlement. A federal judge approved a US$180 million class action lawsuit settlement with SiriusXM Satellite Radio that accuses SiriusXM of breaking the law by raising subscription rates following its 2008 merger. The settlement provided a number of benefits to current and former SiriusXM subscribers, including one free month of service.
 Turtles v. Sirius XM – SiriusXM paid up to US$99 million to settle a class action lawsuit filed by The Turtles after the satellite radio company spent years broadcasting songs recorded before 1972 without compensating labels or artists.

See also 

 Applied Media Technologies Corporation – Primary distribution partner for SIRIUS commercial accounts
 Commercialization of space
 Digital Satellite Broadcasting Corporation, a SDARS license auction participant
 Dish Network
 Primosphere Limited Partnership, a SDARS license auction participant
 WorldSpace, a satellite radio company
 XM Satellite Radio, a satellite radio company
 Sirius XM, a satellite radio company

References

External links
 Sirius Satellite Radio Official website (United States)
 Sirius Satellite Radio Official website (Canada)
 Sirius Satellite Radio All access channel guide
 Sirius Satellite Radio Printable channel guide 
 FCC Spectrum Award News Release: INTERNATIONAL BUREAU GRANTS SATELLITE DIGITAL AUDIO RADIO AUTHORIZATION

 
1994 initial public offerings
American companies established in 1990
American companies disestablished in 2011
Defunct companies based in New York City
Defunct radio broadcasting companies of the United States
Mass media companies established in 1990
Mass media companies disestablished in 2011
2008 mergers and acquisitions
1990 establishments in Washington, D.C.
2011 disestablishments in New York (state)